Glyphipterix cyanophracta is a species of sedge moth in the genus Glyphipterix. It was described by Edward Meyrick in 1882. It is found in Australia, including New South Wales and Victoria.

References

Moths described in 1882
Glyphipterigidae
Moths of Australia